Lidlington railway station serves the village of Lidlington in Bedfordshire, England. The station's two platforms once faced each other, either side of the double tracks. This has since been modified to have staggered platforms either side of the level crossing in order to reduce the time the barriers spend down.

The former station building is now a private home.

History
Opened in 1846 by the Bedford Railway, it became part of the London, Midland and Scottish Railway in the 1923 Grouping. The station passed to the London Midland Region of British Railways on nationalisation in 1948.

Lidlington station had a station building, one of four of the same design that are unique to this line. The station building is in a half-timbered Gothic Revival style that had been insisted upon by the 7th Duke of Bedford for stations close to the Woburn Estate. The station building is now a private home.

Services
All services at Lidlington are operated by London Northwestern Railway. There is no Sunday service.

Community Rail Partnership
Lidlington station, in common with others on the Marston Vale Line, is covered by the Marston Vale Community Rail Partnership, which aims to increase use of the line by involving local people.

References

External links

Railway stations in Bedfordshire
DfT Category F2 stations
Former London and North Western Railway stations
Railway stations in Great Britain opened in 1846
Railway stations served by West Midlands Trains
1846 establishments in England
East West Rail